Philbert Frog is a British children's animated television series made by Fat City Films and produced by Heather Pedley and Philbert Frog Ltd. Created by Vincent James, it was first shown on the BBC on 24 September 1993 and ended on 17 December 1993.

Philbert Frog is a forgetful, enthusiastic and silly frog who lives in the fictional Noggit Wood. Each episode sees him implicate himself and his pals in adventures of varying lunacy. His friends include Herbert Hedgehog, Melvin Mouse, Willie Worm (who once tried to tunnel to Mars), Monty Mole, Oscar Owl, Bertie Bird, and Tiffany Tortoise (who is quite sensible).

The series ran for 13 5-minute episodes and later aired on TCC and in several countries such as ABC in Australia.

Episode list
Philbert Frog Super Hero (24 September 1993)
Philbert and the Sleepless Night (1 October 1993)
Philbert and the Dinosaur (8 October 1993)
Philbert builds a House (15 October 1993)
Philbert goes to the Moon (22 October 1993)
Philbert the Artist (29 October 1993)
Philbert and the Race (5 November 1993)
Philbert Frog and the Giant Ape (12 November 1993)
Exotic Frog (19 November 1993)
Philbert and the Swimming Adventure (26 November 1993)
Philbert the Detective (3 December 1993)
Philbert Frog forgets to Hop (10 December 1993)
Philbert and the Snowy Day (17 December 1993)

Credits
 Scripts Phil Jackson
Animation
 Mark Mason Tony Garth Animation Ltd
 Storyboards and Layouts  Jez Hall, Vincent James, Paul Salmon
 Backgrounds  Michelle Graney, Aileen Raistrick

Other adaptations
Five spin-off books by Vincent James were published by Hazar Publishing in the same year.

Philbert Frog — The Naughty Cousin
Philbert Frog — The Wishing Wand
Philbert Frog Loses his Memory
Philbert Frog — The Sunny Day

External links
Mark Mason Animation
Toonhound

1993 British television series debuts
1993 British television series endings
1990s British animated television series
BBC children's television shows
British children's animated adventure television series
Animated television series about frogs
English-language television shows